Jongno may refer to:

Jongno, a street in Jongno-gu
Jongno-gu
Jongno (constituency)
Jongno (film)
Jongno 3-ga Station - A station on the Seoul metro
Jongno 5-ga Station - A station on the Seoul metro